François-Louis Rousselet, marquis de Châteaurenault (Châteaurenaut, Châteauregnaud) (1637- Paris, 15 November 1716) was a French vice-admiral, maréchal, and nobleman.

In his youth, he fought in the Battle of the Dunes (1658) against the Spanish. In 1661 he joined the French navy and distinguished himself in the conquest of Jijel under François de Vendôme, duc de Beaufort (23 July 1664).

In 1672 he became captain of his own ship and fought in the Mediterranean against the pirates from Salé. In 1673 he led a squadron in the North Sea and fought Michiel de Ruyter in 1675. In 1677, along the Spanish coast and with only six ships, he withstood an attack by a fleet of 25 Dutch ships under Cornelis Evertsen the younger.

During the War of the Grand Alliance (War of the League of Augsburg), he landed a French army in Ireland after beating Admiral Herbert in the Battle of Bantry Bay. One year later, after the failure of this expedition, he evacuated the French army as well as 18.000 Irish.

He then fought in the naval Battle of Beachy Head (1690) and the Battle of Lagos (1693).

He was made vice-admiral in 1701, and commanded the French fleet during the Battle of Vigo Bay (1702). His flagship was La Forte, which was burnt during the battle.

He became governor of Brittany in 1704.

He was made a member of the Order of the Holy Spirit on 2 February 1705. htm]

On 7 September 1684 he had married Marie Anne de La Porte, vicomtesse d'Artois and dame de Crozon (1661–1696). 
His only son, Louis Emmanuel, also pursued a career in the French Navy.

Honours and legacy 
A number of ships of the French navy have been named Châteaurenault in his honour.

Further, a street in Rennes has been named after him.

References

External links
 Documents maritimes

1637 births
1716 deaths
French Navy admirals
French marquesses
Chateaurenault
Marshals of France
French military personnel of the Nine Years' War
French military personnel of the Franco-Dutch War